Kinchkha Waterfall Natural Monument is a cascade waterfall in Khoni Municipality, Imereti region of Georgia near village Kinchkha in the river gorge of Okatse (Satsikvilo) at 843 meters above sea level. Kinchkha Waterfall has three steps in the chalkstone slopes: the upper step with 25m height drop, the main waterfall with 70 meter height drop and the third one with 20 meters high drop, which has additional water supply from the small streams. The main waterfall created huge siphons in a flatland.
It is possible to visit Kinchka waterfall and nearby Lomina waterfall by marked trails, however typical tourist infrastructure is not arranged.

See also 
Okatse Canyon Natural Monument

References

Natural monuments of Georgia (country)
Waterfalls of Georgia (country)
Geography of Imereti
Protected areas established in 2007
2007 establishments in Georgia (country)